Starfish Television Network was the first public service broadcaster that primarily broadcast programming by and about non-profit humanitarian organizations, at no cost for airtime to those organizations.

Founded in early 2007, Starfish began broadcasting on April 18, 2007.  It ceased on March 31, 2010. At its peak, it was available to over 13 million households and featured nearly 600 non-profit organizations.

Television networks in the United States
Television channels and stations established in 2007